The following lists events that happened during 1971 in Greece.

Incumbents
Monarch: Constantine II
Regent: Georgios Zoitakis
Prime Minister: Georgios Papadopoulos

Events

December
 December 15 – The 1971 Intercontinental Cup took place in Greece.

Date unknown
 Greece resumed diplomatic relations with Albania.

References

External links

 
Years of the 20th century in Greece
Greece
Greece
1970s in Greece